Lygistorrhinidae is a family of long-beaked fungus gnats in the order Diptera. There are about 7 genera and at least 30 described species in Lygistorrhinidae.

Genera
†Archaeognoriste Blagoderov & Grimaldi, 2004
Asiorrhina Blagoderov, Hippa & Sevcik, 2009
Blagorrhina Hippa, Mattsson & Vilkamaa, 2005
Gracilorrhina Hippa, Mattsson & Vilkamaa, 2005
Labellorrhina Hippa, Mattsson & Vilkamaa, 2005
Loyugesa Grimaldi & Blagoderov, 2001
Lygistorrhina Skuse, 1890
Matileola Papp 2002
†Palaeognoriste Meunier, 1904
†Plesiognoriste Blagoderov & Grimaldi, 2004
Probolaeus Williston, 1896
Seguyola Matile, 1990

References

Further reading

External links

 

Sciaroidea
Nematocera families